Peter Rainer is a German violinist, known by his activity as a concert master and performance of chamber music. He has been performing at famous music halls such as Berliner Philharmonie, Carnegie Hall in New York City, and Walt Disney Concert Hall in Los Angeles.

Since 1994 he is concert master of the international chamber string orchestra I Palpiti conducted by Eduard Schmieder. 2005 Peter Rainer was honoured by the city of Los Angeles for his merits about culture.

1996-2000 Peter Rainer was the first concert master of the Brandenburg Philharmonic Orchestra Potsdam, and currently is concert master of the 
Kammerakademie Potsdam.

Together with eight further soloist, in 1998 he founded the Persius Ensemble, a chamber music ensemble dedicated in particular to the classical nonet 
literature. In 2007 their CD with pieces of Louis Spohr, Muzio Clementi and Wolfgang Amadeus Mozart was elected „CD of the week“ by Rundfunk Berlin Brandenburg (RBB).

In his performances as a soloist, his special attention is devoted to contemporary and rarely performed pieces of the violin literature. In 2003, 
the composer Gerhard Rosenfeld wrote his 3. violin concerto for Peter Rainer.

On the occasion of an homage for Volker Schlöndorff, he founded the Merlino string quartet, distinguished by deep analysis of performance 
practice. His performances with baroque violin has been inspired also by concerts together with Andrea Marcon, Giuliano Carmignola, John Holloway, Kristian Bezuidenhout and Bernhard Forck.

Apart from concert performances, Peter Rainer is a committed violin teacher. Since 2007 he works as an assistant of Professor Uwe-Martin Haiberg at Universität der Künste Berlin. He also conceptualized and executed particularly successful concerts for children.

Education 
Peter Rainer has grown up in Rödelsee in Bavaria.  He started playing violin at the age of 8 years. He was studying until 1992 with Max Speermann at the Hermann Zilcher Konservatorium in Würzburg. He completed his studies in the US with Professor Eduard Schmieder at the Meadows School of the Arts, where he received his Artist Certificate in 1994 and his Master of Violin Performance degree in 1995. Musical encounters with Hermann Krebbers, Amsterdam, and Andre Gertler, Brüssel, at master classes have also shaped his early development.

References 

Living people
German classical violinists
Male classical violinists
German male violinists
Concertmasters
Year of birth missing (living people)
21st-century classical violinists
21st-century German male musicians